Buer may refer to:

People
 Gary Buer (born 1946), an American football coach
 Karsten Buer (1913–1993), a Norwegian harness coach

Other uses
 Buer (demon), a spirit that appears in the 16th-century Pseudomonarchia Daemonum
Buer, a devil in Dungeons & Dragons
 Clotho Buer, a fictional character in the anime Gundam SEED
 Buer, Germany, a suburb of Gelsenkirchen
 Buer, a municipality of Melle, Germany
 Buer stasjon, a weather station near Halden, Norway

See also

Beur (disambiguation)
Butter (French: beurre)